Ophiodermella cancellata is a species of sea snail, a marine gastropod mollusk in the family Borsoniidae.

Description
The shell resembles a young Ophiodermella inermis in form. The spire is decorticated with four planate whorls remaining. The suture is distinct. The sculpture of the shell shows about twenty small longitudinal ribs crossed by close revolving striae, cancellating the surface, and sometimes the intersections are subnodulous.

It is a vermivore, but it feeds mainly on an oweniid polychaete, Galathowenia oculata (Zachs, 1923)

Distribution
This species occurs in the Pacific Ocean from British Columbia, Canada to Washington, USA

References

 Carpenter, Philip Pearsall. Supplementary report on the present state of our knowledge with regard to the Mollusca of the west coast of North America. Taylor & Francis, 1864.
 McLean J.H. (1996). The Prosobranchia. In: Taxonomic Atlas of the Benthic Fauna of the Santa Maria Basin and Western Santa Barbara Channel. The Mollusca Part 2 – The Gastropoda. Santa Barbara Museum of Natural History. volume 9: 1–160

External links
 
  Bouchet P., Kantor Yu.I., Sysoev A. & Puillandre N. (2011) A new operational classification of the Conoidea. Journal of Molluscan Studies 77: 273–308.

cancellata
Gastropods described in 1864